Gheorghe Gușet (28 May 1968 – 12 June 2017) was a Romanian shot putter. He competed at the 1992, 2000 and 2004 Olympics and had his best result in 2004, aged 36 (14th place). Gușet was noted for being competitive in his late 30s, and set his all-time personal record aged 38, while most shot putters peak in their late 20s or early 30s. Due to health problems (chronic kidney disease) he was forced to retire from competitions in 2008. On 25 October 2008, a kidney transplantation was carried out successfully. Gușet died on 12 June 2017 in Cluj Napoca, Romania from an aortic dissection at the age of 49.

Competition record

References

1968 births
2017 deaths
Romanian male shot putters
Olympic male shot putters
Olympic athletes of Romania
Athletes (track and field) at the 1992 Summer Olympics
Athletes (track and field) at the 2000 Summer Olympics
Athletes (track and field) at the 2004 Summer Olympics
World Athletics Championships athletes for Romania
Japan Championships in Athletics winners
Kidney transplant recipients
Deaths from aortic dissection
People from Zalău